T. maxima may refer to:

 Thalassina maxima, a mud lobster
 Thapsia maxima, a poisonous plant
 Thysanolaena maxima, a perennial grass
 Tipula maxima, a crane fly
 Tridacna maxima, an Indo-Pacific bivalve
 Trifurcula maxima, a European moth
 Trigonodes maxima, an owlet moth